Anton Lars Tinnerholm (born 26 February 1991) is a Swedish professional footballer who plays as a defender for Allsvenskan club Malmö FF.

Career

Åtvidabergs FF
In his early years Tinnerholm played for local Östergötland clubs Brokinds IF and IK Östria Lambohov before moving to play professionally for Åtvidabergs FF, one of the larger clubs in the county. Tinnerholm moved to Åtvidaberg in 2008 but didn't make his first league appearance for the club until the year after. After making twelve appearances for Åtvidaberg in Sweden's second tier Superettan, in 2009, he played a much smaller role and played only two matches for the club after they had been promoted to the 2010. Back in Superettan again for the 2011 season Tinnerholm played regularly and appeared in 28 of 30 matches for the club as they won the league, and thus also promotion back to Allsvenskan. Tinnerholm continued to play regularly for the club as he made 25 appearances in 2012 and 29 appearances in 2013 as the club enjoyed mid table results.

Malmö FF
Tinnerholm signed for reigning Swedish champions Malmö FF on 11 July 2014. The transfer was completed on 15 July 2014 when the Swedish transfer window opened. Tinnerholm wore the number 3 jersey, previously worn by Miiko Albornoz who left the club after playing at the 2014 FIFA World Cup. In the 2014 season Tinnerholm played regularly for the club, becoming league champions and qualifying for the group stage of the 2014–15 UEFA Champions League. He scored his first league goal for Malmö FF against his former club Åtvidaberg on 1 November 2014 in a 2–1 loss.

New York City
On 13 December 2017, Tinnerholm signed with MLS side New York City FC on a free transfer. He scored his first goal for the club on 11 March 2018 against LA Galaxy and his second goal on 31 March 2018 against the San Jose Earthquakes. He left New York at the end of the 2022 season.

Return to Malmö 
On 14 November 2022, it was officially announced that Tinnerholm would return to Malmö FF on a free transfer, signing a four-year contract with the club in the process and being registered since January 2023.

Personal
In February 2019, Tinnerholm earned a U.S. green card which qualifies him as a domestic player for MLS roster purposes.

Career statistics

Club

International

Honours
;Åtvidabergs FF
 Superettan: 2011
Malmö FF
 Allsvenskan: 2014, 2016, 2017
 Svenska Supercupen: 2014
New York City FC
MLS Cup: 2021
Individual
 Allsvenskan defender of the year: 2017

References

External links
 
 
 
 

1991 births
Living people
Allsvenskan players
Association football defenders
Åtvidabergs FF players
Expatriate soccer players in the United States
Major League Soccer players
Malmö FF players
New York City FC players
Sportspeople from Linköping
Superettan players
Sweden international footballers
Swedish expatriate footballers
Swedish footballers
Footballers from Östergötland County